The New York City Horror Film Festival is an international film festival based in New York City that screens films from the horror genre. It was founded by Michael J. Hein in 2001. It takes place each year in New York City for a week in November.

The festival presents awards best feature film, shorts, cinematography, FX, actor and actress, screenplay, and audience choice. The festival also awards lifetime achievement awards recognizing the careers of horror filmmakers.

Lifetime achievement award
Since 2002, the New York City Horror Film Festival has given the Lifetime Achievement Award to one legendary horror filmmaker each year. Recipients are as follows:

2016 - Adrienne Barbeau
2015 - Sean S. Cunningham
2014 - Angus Scrimm
2013 - Lloyd Kaufman
2012 - Wes Craven
2010 - Robert Englund
2009 - William Lustig
2008 - Frank Henenlotter
2007 - Herschell Gordon Lewis
2006 - Mick Garris
2005 - Roger Corman
2004 - Tobe Hooper
2003 - Tom Savini
2002 - George A. Romero

Awards

Guests

2008
Frank Henenlotter
William Lustig
Michael Gingold

2007
 Eli Roth
 Herschell Gordon Lewis
William Lustig
Michael Gingold
Frank Zagarino
Roy Fumkis

2006
 Tony Todd was presented with a special award for "Excellence In Acting" in horror films
 Mick Garris was presented the Lifetime Achievement Award
 Ken Foree
 Betsy Palmer
 Michael Gingold
 Joe Kane
 William Lustig
 Jack Ketchum

2005
 Roger Corman, who received the Lifetime Achievement Award
 Don Coscarelli
 Angus Scrimm
 Michael Gingold
 Armand Mastroianni
 William Lustig

2004
 Tobe Hooper received the Lifetime Achievement Award
 Amanda Plummer
Jeff Lieberman
William Lustig
Michael Gingold

2003
 Tom Savini received the Lifetime Achievement Award
 Lloyd Kaufman
 Joe Bob Briggs
 Michael Ruggerio

2002
 George A. Romero to receive the Lifetime Achievement Award
 Felissa Rose
 Lloyd Kaufman

References

External links
 

Film festivals in New York City
Fantasy and horror film festivals in the United States